Kallax is a locality situated in Luleå Municipality, Norrbotten County, Sweden with 321 inhabitants in 2010. Luleå Airport is situated near Kallax.

The KALLAX shelf from IKEA is named after the village.

References 

Populated places in Luleå Municipality
Norrbotten